Kidnapped is a 1935 Danish family film written and directed by Lau Lauritzen Jr. and Alice O'Fredericks.

Cast
 Ib Schønberg as Peter Basse
 Arthur Jensen as Larsen
 Olga Svendsen as Hansine
 Osa Massen as Grethe
 Eigil Reimers as Benjamin Smith
 Per Gundmann as Automobilagent Hansen
 Holger-Madsen as Kriminalassistent
 Connie Meiling as Lille Connie

References

External links

1935 films
1930s Danish-language films
Danish black-and-white films
Films directed by Lau Lauritzen Jr.
Films directed by Alice O'Fredericks